Fabian Goodall (born 13 December 1994) is an Australian and Fijian professional footballer who is currently playing for the Western Rams in the Intrust Super Cup. Goodall is a Fiji representative.

Background
Born in Sydney, Goodall is of Fijian descent. Goodall played his junior football for the Wentworthville Magpies and attended The Hills Sports High School before being signed by the Manly-Warringah Sea Eagles. Goodall played for the Sea Eagles NYC side in 2012 when he was also selected into Laure Daley's "Blues in Waiting" Origin Pathways Squad. In late 2012 Goodall signed with the Parramatta Eels, playing in the Eels NYC team in 2013 and 2014. He was named in the Junior Kiwis train on squad in 2013, failing to make the final team to play the Junior Kangaroos. He moved to the Eels New South Wales Cup team the Wentworthville Magpies in 2015.

Playing career
In October 2014, Goodall made his International début as he was selected to play for Fiji in the 2014 Hayne/Mannah Cup test match against Lebanon at Remondis Stadium.

On 7 May 2016, Goodall played for Fiji against Papua New Guinea in the 2016 Melanesian Cup where he played in the second row position in the 24–22 loss at Parramatta Stadium.

Switch to rugby union
In August 2016, Goodall made the switch from league to union after signing with National Rugby Championship (NRC) side, Western Sydney Rams.

References

External links

Manly Sea Eagles profile

1994 births
Australian rugby league players
Australian people of Fijian descent
Fiji national rugby league team players
Wentworthville Magpies players
Rugby league centres
Rugby league wingers
Living people
Australian rugby union players
Rugby union centres
Rugby union wings
Greater Sydney Rams players
Melbourne Rising players
Toronto Arrows players